Sariya, Sariyah or Suriya may refer to:

Given name
Sariyah Hines, Canadian contestant on the reality music competition series The Launch
Sariya Jones, participant on the TV series Tough Love
Sariya Lakoba (1904–1939), Soviet woman who was the spouse of Nestor Lakoba
Sariya Sharp (born 1975), Canadian actress on the TV series You Can't Do That on Television
Sariya Zakyrova (born 1964), Russian Olympic rower

Places
Barki Saraiya, a census town in Giridih district, Jharkhand, India
Sariya (community development block), in Giridih district, Jharkhand, India
Suriya, Giridih, inhabited place not identified as a separate place in 2011 census, a part of Barki Saraiya

See also
Saraya (disambiguation)
Sabina (disambiguation)
Sabrina (disambiguation)
Saira (disambiguation)
Supriya
Sarah (disambiguation)
Sarai (disambiguation) / or Serai / Saraj
Sarina (disambiguation)
Serina (disambiguation)
Sarita (disambiguation)
Seraiah, a Hebrew name
Seraya (disambiguation)
Shakila (disambiguation)
Shakira (disambiguation)
Soraya (disambiguation)
Surya (disambiguation)